Kiryas Joel (often locally abbreviated as KJ) is a village coterminous with the Town of Palm Tree in Orange County, New York, United States. The village shares one government with the Town. The vast majority of its residents are Yiddish-speaking Hasidic Jews who belong to the worldwide Satmar sect of Hasidism.

Kiryas Joel is part of the Poughkeepsie-Newburgh-Middletown New York Metropolitan Statistical Area, as well as the larger New York Combined Statistical Area.

According to the Census Bureau's American Community Survey, Kiryas Joel has by far the youngest median age population of any municipality in the United States, and the youngest, at 13.2 years old, of any population center of over 5,000 residents in the United States.

Residents of Kiryas Joel, like those of other Haredi and Orthodox Jewish communities, typically have large families, and this has driven rapid population growth.

According to 2008 census figures, the village has the highest poverty rate in the nation. More than two-thirds of the residents live below the federal poverty line, and 40% receive food stamps. It is also the place in the United States with the highest percentage of people who reported Hungarian ancestry, as 18.9% of the population reported Hungarian descent in 2000.

History

Kiryas Joel is named for the late Rabbi Joel Teitelbaum, the rebbe of Satmar and driving spirit behind the project. 

The Satmar Hasidim came from Satu Mare, Romania, known when under Hungarian rule as Szatmár. Teitelbaum, originally from Romania, rebuilt the Satmar Hasidic dynasty after World War II. 

In 1947, Teitelbaum settled with his followers in the Williamsburg section of Brooklyn, a borough of New York City. By the 1970s, he decided to move the growing community to Monroe, New York, a location more secluded from what he considered the harmful influences and immorality of the outside world, yet close to the metropolitan area's commercial center. The land for Kiryas Joel was purchased in the early 1970s, and 14 Satmar families settled there in the summer of 1974. When he died in 1979, Teitelbaum was the first person to be buried in the town's cemetery. His funeral reportedly brought over 100,000 mourners to Kiryas Joel.

It is widely believed that no candidates run for the village's board or the school board unless approved by the grand rebbe, Rabbi Aaron Teitelbaum. In 2001, Kiryas Joel held a competitive election in which all candidates supported by the grand rebbe were re-elected by a 55–45% margin.

As of 2019, the village of Kiryas Joel separated from the town of Monroe, to become part of the town of Palm Tree, New York's first new town in 38 years. On July 1, 2018, Gov. Andrew Cuomo signed a bill to create Palm Tree, triggering elections for the first governing board. The new town had 10 elected positions on the November 2018 ballot, including a supervisor, four council members, and two justices to preside over a town court.

The name "Palm Tree" is a calque (translation) of the surname/family name of Joel Teitelbaum. In Yiddish, teitel (טייטל) means "date palm" and baum means "tree".

Geography
According to the United States Census Bureau, the village has a total area of 1.1 square miles (2.8 km2), and only a very small portion of the area (a small duck pond called "Forest Road Lake" in the center of the village) is covered with water.

Demographics

Kiryas Joel began with a 1977 founding population of 500 people.
As of the census of 2000, there were 13,138 people, 2,229 households, and 2,137 families residing in the village. The racial make-up of the village was 99.02% White, 0.21% African American, 0.02% Asian, 0.12% from other races, and 0.63% from two or more races. Hispanic or Latino of any race were 0.93% of the population.

Kiryas Joel has the highest percentage of people who reported Hungarian ancestry in the United States, as 18.9% of the population reported Hungarian ancestry in 2000. 3% of the residents of Kiryas Joel were Israeli, 2% Romanian, 1% Polish, and 1% European.

The 2000 census also reported that 6.3% of village residents spoke only English at home, one of the lowest such percentages in the United States. 91.5% of residents spoke Yiddish at home, while 2.3% spoke Hebrew. Of the Yiddish-speaking population in 2000, 46% spoke English "not well" or "not at all". Overall, including those who primarily spoke Hebrew and European languages, as well as primary Yiddish speakers, 46% of Kiryas Joel residents speak English "not well" or "not at all".

There were 2,229 households, out of which 79.5% had children under the age of 18 living with them, 93.2% were married couples living together, 1.6% had a female householder with no husband present, and 4.1% were non-families. 2.8% of all households were made up of individuals, and 2.1% had someone living alone who was 65 years of age or older. The average household size was 5.74, and the average family size was 5.84. In the village, the population was very young, with 57.5% under the age of 18, 17.2% from 18 to 24, 16.5% from 25 to 44, 7.2% from 45 to 64, and 1.6% who were 65 years of age or older. The median age was 15 years. For every 100 females, there were 116.3 males. For every 100 females age 18 and over, there were 118.0 males.

The village abides by strict Jewish customs, and its welcome sign asks visitors to dress conservatively and to "maintain gender separation in all public areas".

Poverty and crime
The median income for a household in the village was $15,138, and the median income for a family was $15,372. Males had a median income of $25,043, versus $16,364 for females. The per capita income for the village was $4,355. About 61.7% of families and 62.2% of the population were below the poverty line, including 63.9% of those under age 18 and 50.5% of those age 65 or over.
 
According to 2008 census figures, the village has the highest poverty rate in the nation, and the largest percentage of residents who receive food stamps. More than five-eighths of Kiryas Joel residents live below the federal poverty line, and more than 40 percent receive food stamps, according to the American Community Survey, a U.S. Census Bureau study of every place in the country with 20,000 residents or more. A 2011 New York Times report noted that, despite the town's very high statistical poverty rates, "It has no slums or homeless people. No one who lives there is shabbily dressed or has to go hungry. Crime is virtually non-existent."

Transportation
Kiryas Joel has a very high rate of public transportation usage. Local transit within the area is operated by the Village of Kiryas Joel Bus System, and also has service to Manhattan and to the heavily Haredi Jewish-populated Williamsburg and Borough Park sections of Brooklyn.

Impact

Of growth

Friction with surrounding jurisdictions

The village has become a contentious issue in Orange County for several reasons, mainly related to its rapid growth. Unlike most other small communities, it lacks a real downtown and much of it is given over to residential property, which has mostly taken the form of contemporary townhouse-style condominiums. New construction is ongoing throughout the community.

Population growth is strong. In 1990, there were 7,400 people in Kiryas Joel; in 2000, 13,100, nearly doubling the population. In 2005, the population had risen to 18,300. The 2010 census showed a population of 20,175, for a population growth rate of 53.6% between 2000 and 2010, which was less than anticipated, as it was projected that the population would double in that time period.

Locally

The Town of Monroe also contains two other villages – Monroe, and Harriman. Kiryas Joel's boundaries also come close to the neighboring towns of Blooming Grove and Woodbury.

Residents of these communities and local Orange County politicians view the village as encroaching on them. Due to the rapid population growth in Kiryas Joel, resulting almost entirely from the high birth rates of its Hasidic population, the village government has undertaken various annexation efforts to expand its area, to the dismay of the majority of the residents of the surrounding communities. Many of these area residents see the expansion of the high-density residential-commercial village as a threat to the quality of life in the surrounding suburban communities, due to suburban sprawl. Other concerns of the surrounding communities are the impact on local aquifers and the projected increased volume of sewage reaching the county's sewerage treatment plants, already near capacity by 2005.

On August 11, 2006, residents of Woodbury voted, by a 3-to-1 margin, to incorporate much of the town as a village, to constrain further annexation. Kiryas Joel has opposed such moves in court.

In March 2007, the village of Kiryas Joel sued the county to stop it from selling off  of excess capacity at its sewage plant in Harriman. Two years earlier, the county had sued the village to stop its plans to tap into New York City's Catskill Aqueduct, arguing that the village's environmental review for the project had inadequately addressed concerns about the additional wastewater it would generate. The village was appealing an early ruling which sided with the county. In its action, Kiryas Joel accused the county of inconsistently claiming limited capacity in its suit when it is selling the million gallons to three communities outside its sewer district.

In 2017, the village proposed to settle a lawsuit over some additional annexations it had proposed by petitioning the county legislature to allow it to become the county's 21st town. It would be named Palm Tree, after the English translation of Joel Teitelbaum's name. In return for the village dropping its request to annex , United Monroe and Preserve Hudson Valley, the plaintiffs, agreed to withdraw their appeal of a decision allowing the annexation of a  parcel. The new town would also be prohibited from filing annexation proposals or encouraging the creation of new villages for 10 years. Two-thirds of the county legislature must approve the creation of the new town, and a vote of Monroe residents may also be required. The referendum passed on November 7, 2017.

Local politics
Critics of the village cite its impact on local politics. Villagers are perceived as voting in a solid bloc. While this is not always the case, the highly concentrated population often does skew strongly toward one candidate or the other in local elections, making Kiryas Joel a heavily courted swing vote for whichever politician offers Kiryas Joel the most favorable environment for continued growth. In the hotly contested 2013 Town Supervisors race, the Kiryas Joel bloc vote elected Harley Doles to the position of town supervisor. Kiryas Joel then sought to annex  of land into their village and the new Monroe Town Board has had no comment on this issue.

Kiryas Joel played a major role in the 2006 Congressional election. The village was at that time in the congressional district represented by Republican Sue Kelly. Village residents had been loyal to Kelly in the past, but in 2006, voters were upset over what they saw as lack of adequate representation from Kelly for the village. In a bloc, Kiryas Joel swung around 2,900 votes to Kelly's Democratic opponent, John Hall . The vote in Kiryas Joel was one reason Hall carried the election, which he did by 4,800 votes.

Internal friction

Joel Teitelbaum had no son, and thus no clear successor. His nephew, Moses, was appointed by the community's committee members. But not all Satmar accepted Moses as the community leader, and even some of those that did questioned some of his actions and pronouncements. He responded by running the village in what they called an autocratic manner, through his deputy, Abraham Weider, who also served as mayor and president of the school board, as well as the main synagogue and yeshiva in the village.

In 1989, the village forbade any property owner from selling or renting an apartment without its permission. Teitelbaum elaborated that "anyone that rents without this permission has to be dealt with like a real murderer ... and he should be torn out from the roots".

In the early 1990s, New York State Police responded many times to the village, which has a generally low crime rate otherwise, when self-described dissidents reported harassment such as broken windows and graffiti of Hebrew profanity on their property. In one incident, troopers rode a school bus undercover to catch teenage boys stoning it; the boys later stoned a back-up police cruiser when it arrived. One of Weider's nephews was among those arrested. He admitted that some of the village's young men took it upon themselves to act violently against dissidents because they could not bear to hear the grand rebbe criticized, although he said most of them were provoked to do so by dissidents.

"Someone not following breaks down the whole system of being able to educate and being able to bring up our children with strong family values", Weider told The New York Times in 1992. "Why do you think we have no drugs? If we lost respect for the Grand Rabbi, we lose the whole thing."

In January 1990, the village held its first, and, for a decade, only, school board election. "It's like this", Teitelbaum explained when he announced the names of seven hand-picked candidates. "With the power of the Torah, I am here the authority in the rabbinical leadership ... As you know, I want to nominate seven people, and I want these people to be the people."

One dissident, Joseph Waldman, decided nevertheless to run on his own. He was made unwelcome at the synagogue, his children were expelled from yeshiva, his car's tires slashed, and his windows broken. Several hundred residents marched in the streets in front of his house chanting, "Death to Joseph Waldman!", after posters calling for that fate were posted in the synagogue. After the election, in which Waldman finished last, but still won 673 votes, 60 families who were known to have voted for him were barred from visiting their fathers' graves in the village cemetery that was owned by the rabbi, and  banned from the synagogue (also, at the time, the village's only polling place). Waldman compared Teitelbaum to Iran's Ayatollah Khomeini.

After the election, a state court ruled that Waldman's children had to be reinstated at the yeshiva, an action that was only taken after the judge held Teitelbaum in contempt and fined him personally. Friction continued as some of the dissidents banned from the synagogue circulated a petition calling for the polls to be moved to a neutral location. It originally drew 150 signatures, but all but 15 retracted their names after being threatened with excommunication by the grand rabbi, signing a document that they had not actually read the petition. One of the dissidents who signed was attacked while praying, and state troopers had to be called in again to disperse a mob that gathered on Waldman's lawn and broke his windows.

In November 2017, a local divorce mediator and an Israeli rabbi with ties to the village were involved in the planning of a contract killing on an estranged husband. They were sentenced to prison.

Electoral fraud allegations

On four occasions since 1990, the Middletown Times-Herald Record has run lengthy investigative articles on claims of electoral fraud in the village. A 1996 article found that Kiryas Joel residents who were students at yeshivas in Brooklyn had on many occasions apparently registered and voted in both the village and in Brooklyn; a year later, the paper reported that it had happened again. In 2001, absentee ballots were apparently cast by voters who did not normally reside in the village. In some cases, ballots were cast by people who seemed to reside in Antwerp, Belgium, without a set date of expected return, and, thus, would not be allowed under New York law to vote in any election for state or local office. That article led to a county grand jury investigation in 2001, which concluded that while procedures were not followed, and many mistakes were made, there was no evidence of deliberate intent to violate the law.

Before the 2013 Republican primary in that year's special election for the state assembly seat vacated by Annie Rabbitt, later elected county clerk, members of United Monroe, a local group that organizes and co-ordinates political opposition to the village and those local officials it believes support it, asked the county's Board of Elections to assign them to Kiryas Joel as election inspectors, who verify that voters are registered before allowing them to vote. The board's Democratic commissioner, Sue Bahrens, initially agreed to appoint six to serve in the village, but later reversed that decision. The six sued the county, alleging religious discrimination; it responded that they had no standing to sue. Village Manager Gedalye Szegedin said the citizens were entitled to have inspectors who spoke Yiddish and understood their culture and customs. A state court justice dismissed the discrimination claim, but ruled that the United Monroe inspectors had been dismissed arbitrarily and capriciously, and were entitled to their appointments, but did not say when or where.

In 2014, the newspaper examined claims by poll watchers from United Monroe that they were intimidated and harassed by other poll watchers sympathetic to the village government when they tried to challenge voters whose signatures did not initially appear to match those on file during the previous year's elections for county offices. They further alleged that election inspectors in the polling place, a banquet hall where 6,000 residents voted, sometimes gave the voters ballots before the signatures could be checked.

Some of the United Monroe poll watchers claimed that Langdon Chapman, an attorney for the Monroe town board, which they believe is controlled by members deferential to Kiryas Joel and its interests, was one of those who intimidated them. Coleman told the Record that while he had been at the banquet hall in question, he had only insisted that poll watchers state the reason for their challenges, as legally required, and had left after two hours. He was subsequently appointed county attorney (the lawyer who represents the county in civil matters) by new county executive Steve Neuhaus, whose margin of victory included all but 20 of the votes from the village.

After the election, United Monroe members found more than 800 voters in Kiryas Joel whose signatures did not match those on file, in addition to 25 they had challenged at the polls, three of whom were later investigated by the county sheriff; the rest were considered unfounded. Orange County District Attorney David Hoovler, elected along with Neuhaus, told the newspaper it was difficult to investigate the allegations, since they could not verify the identity of either signer, if, in fact, there were two. The Record attempted to contact some of those voters; the only one they reached hung up when asked about the election.

Large families

Women in Kiryas Joel usually stop working outside the home after the birth of a second child. Most families have only one income, and many children. The resulting poverty rate makes a disproportionate number of families in Kiryas Joel eligible for welfare benefits, when compared to the rest of the county. The New York Times wrote,

A 60-bed post-natal maternal care center was built with $10 million in state and federal grants. Mothers can recuperate there for two weeks away from their large families.

Hepatitis A and vaccine trial
In the 1990s, the first clinical trials for the hepatitis A vaccine took place in Kiryas Joel, where 70 percent of residents had been affected. This disproportionate rate of hepatitis A infection was due in part to Kiryas Joel's high birth rate and crowded conditions among children, who bathed together in pools and ate from communal food at school. Children who were not infected with hepatitis A were separated into two groups, one receiving the experimental vaccine and the other receiving a placebo injection. Based on this study, the vaccine was declared 100 percent effective. Merck licensed the vaccine in 1995, and it became available in 1996, after which the hepatitis A infection rate fell by 75 percent in the United States.

Litigation
The unusual lifestyle and growth pattern of Kiryas Joel has led to litigation on a number of fronts. In 1994, the Supreme Court ruled in the case of Board of Education of Kiryas Joel Village School District v. Grumet that the Kiryas Joel School District, which covered only the village, was designed in violation of the Establishment Clause of the 1st Amendment, because the design accommodated one group on the basis of religious affiliation. Subsequently, the New York State Legislature established a similar school district in the village that has passed legal muster. Further litigation has resulted over what entity should pay for the education of children with disabilities in Kiryas Joel, and over whether the community's boys must ride buses driven by women. In 2011, a case against the village was heard in federal district court; plaintiffs, asked for the village to be dissolved, said that Kiryas Joel is a theocracy whose existence violates the Establishment Clause of the First Amendment, where local government leaders abuse the laws, such as those for tax-exempt status, zoning, and sanitation, to favor members of their own sect and persecute other Orthodox Jews. They also said that the leaders commit vote fraud by intimidating dissident voters and busing in non-residents.

The district served 217 students in the 2007-2008 school year, and 123 in 2008-2009, all of them under special education, according to NYSED documents.

Education
Most students go to private religious schools; in 2021 there were about 12,000 students attending them. In 2020 the area had almost 24 such schools. In 1994 Kiryas Joel had 5,000 children in the K-12 level with the majority going to private yeshivas and about 200 going to the public special education school.

The public Kiryas Joel School District has a school for special education students. Before 1985, special education students were taught by public school teachers in separate classes within yeshivas, and between 1985 and 1989 special education students were taught in Monroe–Woodbury Central School District facilities.

See also

 New Square, New York − an all-Hasidic village in a neighboring county
 Kaser, New York − an all-Hasidic village in a neighboring county
 Kiryas Tosh, Quebec − an all-Hasidic community in Quebec, Canada
 Qırmızı Qəsəbə
 Shtetl

References

Notes

Footnotes

Further reading
 
 Kiryas Joel Ranks at Top of National List of Municipalities that Lobby the Federal Government OpenSecrets, September 2009)
 2006 Census

External links

 Orange County: Kiryas Joel
 The Kiryas Joel Voice 
 

 
 
1977 establishments in New York (state)
Hungarian-Jewish culture in New York (state)
Kiryas Joel
Jewish communities in the United States
Jewish enclaves
Orthodox Jewish communities
Hasidic Judaism in New York (state)
Populated places established in 1977
Poughkeepsie–Newburgh–Middletown metropolitan area
Satmar (Hasidic dynasty)
Populated places established by Hasidim
Villages in New York (state)
Villages in Orange County, New York
Yiddish culture in New York (state)
Intentional communities in New York (state)